Veniamin Yevgenyevich But (born 1 August 1961) President of Russian rowing Federation (November 2012 – November 2016) is a retired Soviet rower. Competing for the Soviet Union in the men's eight, he won a world title in 1985 and an Olympic silver medal at the 1988 Summer Olympics.

References 
 
 

1961 births
Living people
Russian male rowers
Soviet male rowers
Rowers at the 1988 Summer Olympics
Rowers at the 1992 Summer Olympics
Olympic silver medalists for the Soviet Union
Olympic rowers of the Soviet Union
Olympic rowers of the Unified Team
Olympic medalists in rowing
World Rowing Championships medalists for the Soviet Union
Medalists at the 1988 Summer Olympics
Honoured Masters of Sport of the USSR